Lu Zhi or Lu Chih may refer to:

Empress Lü (呂雉), first empress of the Han dynasty
Lu Zhi (Han dynasty) (盧植), minister of the Eastern Han dynasty
Lu Zhi (卢志), great-grandson of the Eastern Han minister and confidant/strategist of Sima Ying
Lu Zhi (Tang dynasty) (陸贄), chancellor of the Tang dynasty
Lu Zhi (poet) (盧摯), poet of the Yuan dynasty
Lu Zhi (painter) (陸治), painter of the Ming dynasty